HGSE may refer to:
Mercury selenide (HgSe)
Harvard Graduate School of Education